Tamyig script is used to write the Tamang language. The Tamyig script is a simplified version of the Tibetan script.

The Tamang community has their own script which is known as ‘Tamyig’ script. Several literary books was published in Tamang Language. In the year 2001, The IPR department, Government of Sikkim has started to publish Sikkim Herald, an official news bulletin in Tamang Edition. Course St Konjyosom Rural Municipality introduced Tamyig script and Tamang language as local curriculum to be taught in its school.

References

See also
 Tamang language

Writing systems of Nepal